Myrmecorhynchus is a genus of ants in the subfamily Formicinae. The genus is endemic to Australia, where its species are found in forested areas. They nest in soil or on trees or shrubs.

Species
 Myrmecorhynchus carteri Clark, 1934
 Myrmecorhynchus emeryi André, 1896
 Myrmecorhynchus nitidus Clark, 1934

References

External links

Formicinae
Ant genera
Hymenoptera of Australia